The Istanbul Football League was founded as a regional football league under the name Constantinople Football Association League by James La Fontaine and Henry Pears in Istanbul, the capital of the former Ottoman Empire, in 1904. The Istanbul League was the first football organization ever in the Ottoman Empire and later Turkey. In the inaugural 1904–05 season the matches between the four teams, Moda FC, HMS Imogene, Elpis FC, and Cadi-Keuy FC were played on Sundays, leading to the name of the league, Istanbul Sunday League. Henry Pears, an Englishman and one of the three founders, promised to ultimately award the shield to the club with the most championships won during the initial 10 years.

The Istanbul Friday League was founded in 1915 and replaced the Istanbul Sunday League. Seven teams participated in its inaugural 1915–16 season. From 1923–24 to 1950–51 the league was called Istanbul League. The name was later changed and became Istanbul Professional League in the 1952 season, as professionalism was introduced by the Turkish Football Federation in 1951.

Fenerbahçe are the most successful club, having won the league a record 16 times in total.

Champions

Istanbul Sunday League (İstanbul Pazar Ligi)

1905 HMS Imogene FC
1906 Cadi-Keuy FC
1907 Cadi-Keuy FC

1908 Moda FC
1909 Galatasaray SK
1910 Galatasaray SK

1911 Galatasaray SK
1912 Fenerbahçe SK
1913 Unaccomplished due to the Balkan Wars

1914 Fenerbahçe SK
1915 Fenerbahçe SK

Istanbul Friday League (İstanbul Cuma Ligi)

1915 Galatasaray SK
1916 Galatasaray SK
1917 Altınordu İdman Yurdu

1918 Altınordu İdman Yurdu
1919 Unaccomplished due to Mudros Armistice

1920 Cancelled
1921 Fenerbahçe SK

1922 Galatasaray SK
1923 Fenerbahçe SK

Istanbul League (İstanbul Ligi)

1924 Beşiktaş JK
1925 Galatasaray SK
1926 Galatasaray SK
1927 Galatasaray SK
1928 Cancelled due to the Summer Olympics in Amsterdam
1929 Galatasaray SK
1930 Fenerbahçe SK

1931 Galatasaray SK
1932 İstanbulspor
1933 Fenerbahçe SK
1934 Beşiktaş JK
1935 Fenerbahçe SK
1936 Fenerbahçe SK
1937 Fenerbahçe SK

1938 Güneş SK
1939 Beşiktaş JK
1940 Beşiktaş JK
1941 Beşiktaş JK
1942 Beşiktaş JK
1943 Beşiktaş JK
1944 Fenerbahçe SK

1945 Beşiktaş JK
1946 Beşiktaş JK
1947 Fenerbahçe SK
1948 Fenerbahçe SK
1949 Galatasaray SK
1950 Beşiktaş JK
1951 Beşiktaş JK

Istanbul Professional League 
1952 Beşiktaş JK
1953 Fenerbahçe SK
1954 Beşiktaş JK
1955 Galatasaray SK
1956 Galatasaray SK
1957 Fenerbahçe SK
1958 Galatasaray SK
1959 Fenerbahçe SK

Performance by club 

*Galatasaray in the Istanbul Football Union League and Fenerbahçe in the Istanbul Champions League became champions.

Top Scorers

Records

Titles
 Most titles: 16
 Fenerbahçe SK

 Most consecutive titles: 5
 Beşiktaş JK (1938–39, 1939–40, 1940–41, 1941–42, 1942–43)

Biggest wins
20–0, Galatasaray SK vs Vefa SK, 1925–26
16–0, Fenerbahçe SK vs Anadolu Üsküdar 1908, 1930–31
14–0, Fenerbahçe SK vs Topkapı SK, 1938–39
14–0, Fenerbahçe SK vs Topkapı SK, 1939–40
14–1, Galatasaray SK vs Anadolu Üsküdar 1908, 1914–15
13–0, Fenerbahçe SK vs Süleymaniye SK, 1930–31
13–0, Beşiktaş JK vs Hilal SK, 1939–40
13–1, Fenerbahçe SK vs Davutpaşa SK, 1942–43
12–0, Fenerbahçe SK vs Süleymaniye SK, 1915–16
12–0, Beşiktaş JK vs Topkapı SK, 1939–40
12–1, Galatasaray SK vs Topkapı SK, 1936–37
12–1, Beşiktaş JK vs Taksim SK, 1941–42
11–0, Galatasaray SK vs Moda-Imogene Muhteliti, 1909–10
10–0, Galatasaray SK vs Süleymaniye SK, 1934–35
11–2, Beşiktaş JK vs Eyüp SK, 1936–37
11–2, Galatasaray SK vs Eyüp SK, 1937–38
11–2, Beşiktaş JK vs Eyüp SK, 1937–38
11–2, Beşiktaş JK vs Kasımpaşa SK, 1943–44
11–2, Beşiktaş JK vs İstanbulspor, 1943–44

References

Sources
 Fenerbahçe Spor Kulübü Tarihi 1907–1957, Dr. Rüştü Dağlaroğlu 

 
Sports leagues established in 1904
1904 establishments in the Ottoman Empire
1959 disestablishments in Turkey
Defunct football leagues in Turkey